Ashley Birdsall is an American ice hockey defender, currently playing for the Buffalo Beauts in the NWHL.

Career 

Birdsall had originally committed to the University of Minnesota-Duluth, before the team scaled back their offers to new players. Instead she chose to go to the University of Wisconsin-Superior, where she would play for a year and a half before leaving to join the military. She would return in 2013, and finished her university career with 15 points in 74 games.

After university, she would play for the independent Minnesota Whitecaps for three years. In August 2019, she signed a professional contracts with the Beauts.

Personal life 
Birdsall is a captain in the Minnesota Army National Guard.

References

External links
 Biographical information and career statistics from Elite Prospects

Buffalo Beauts players
1990 births
Living people
American women's ice hockey defensemen
Ice hockey people from Duluth, Minnesota
21st-century American women